Milan Djordjević (born 30 January 1986) is a Serbian football player, now free agent who plays for Besëlidhja Lezhë in the Albanian First Division.

Club career
He was a key player of Besëlidhja and he declared that he will stay in Lezhë to help the team promote to the highest division of the country and he said that he is now a fluent talker of Albanian Language so he won't leave the city.

References

1986 births
Living people
Serbian footballers
Association football defenders
FK BASK players
Besëlidhja Lezhë players
Kategoria e Parë players
Serbian expatriate footballers
Expatriate footballers in Albania
Serbian expatriate sportspeople in Albania